Dominic Storey (born 15 October 1989) is a racing driver from New Zealand. He currently drives the No. 63 Holden VF Commodore for Eggleston Motorsport in the Dunlop Super2 Series.

Career

Formula BMW
After a karting career in his native New Zealand, Storey made his single–seater debut in 2006 in Formula BMW Asia, finishing the season fourth overall whilst teammate to current Formula 1 star Daniel Ricciardo. He also contested two races in the British series, having competed for Räikkönen Robertson Racing in Oulton Park where he placed 5th on debut.

Toyota Racing Series
After three races in 2007, Storey took part on a full-time basis in Toyota Racing Series in 2007–08 with Victory Motor Racing. He took podium–finishes to be classified in fifth place with 792 points and a lap record at the Taupo Motorsport Park.

Formula Renault and Formula Three
In 2008 Storey made his debut in Formula Renault category with participation in the Formula Renault 2.0 West European Cup series at Estoril. He remained in series for 2009 and joined Eurocup Formula Renault 2.0, but spent only two rounds in both series. He also appeared as a guest driver at Donington Park in British Formula 3.

Australian GT Championship
Storey raced in the 2016 CAMS Australian GT Endurance Championship in the new AMG GT3 partnering Peter Hackett. The duo finished runner-up in the Championship with 3 lap records and a podium finish in the Phillip Island 101.

Racing record

Career summary

† – As Storey was a guest driver, he was ineligible for championship points.

Complete GP3 Series results
(key) (Races in bold indicate pole position) (Races in italics indicate fastest lap)

Super2 Series results
(key) (Round results only)

References

External links
Official website
Career details from Driver Database

1989 births
Living people
New Zealand racing drivers
Formula Renault Eurocup drivers
Formula Renault 2.0 WEC drivers
Formula BMW UK drivers
Formula BMW Asia drivers
British Formula Three Championship drivers
Toyota Racing Series drivers
World Series Formula V8 3.5 drivers
New Zealand GP3 Series drivers
V8SuperTourer drivers
Australian Endurance Championship drivers
Eurasia Motorsport drivers
SG Formula drivers
Double R Racing drivers
Pons Racing drivers
Mercedes-AMG Motorsport drivers
Boutsen Ginion Racing drivers